Douglas Reynolds Gallery is an art gallery in Vancouver, British Columbia. It is located in the Business Improvement Area of South Granville. The gallery was founded in 1995 by Douglas Reynolds.

History
Douglas Reynolds Gallery specializes in contemporary Northwest Coast art, working closely with Northwest Coast Indigenous artists. The gallery represents over 100 artists from indigenous cultural groups spanning from the Haida and Tlingit in northern British Columbia to the Coast Salish in the Vancouver area and northern Washington state.

Artwork

Wood
The gallery displays woodwork that ranges from totem poles to carved paddles and masks. Nearly all totem poles are carved from a single trunk of a Western red cedar. The cedar tree is the most common wood used and is known as the tree of life on the Northwest Coast because of its versatility and abundance. Other wood types include yellow cedar, maple, and alder.

Gold and Silver Jewelry
The gallery carries a wide range of jewelry products that continue a tradition of personal adornment dating back to the 1840s, including gold and silver rings, bracelets, and pendants. The majority of pieces are modern works, however, the gallery also carries historic jewelry pieces and works by past artists, notably Haida artist Bill Reid.

Media and Commissions
TELUS has furnished its Vancouver headquarters with the help of the gallery.

The gallery was featured in Maker of Monsters, a 2017 documentary on the life and work of Kwakwaka'wakw artist Beau Dick. Douglas Reynolds was interviewed in the documentary talking about his professional and personal relationship with Beau Dick, lasting over 30 years.

In 2020 Haisla artist Hollie Bartlett gifted an 18kt Gold Whale Tail pendant from Douglas Reynolds Gallery to Vancouver non-profit Justice for Girls, who donated it to Meghan Markle.

In February 2020 visiting AINU artist from Japan, Hiroyuki Shimokura visited the gallery and met with Tsimshian artist Phil Gray.

See also
Northwest Coast Art
Contemporary Art
Canadian Art
Coast Salish Art
Haida People
Bill Reid
Robert Davidson

Works Cited

References

External links
Douglas Reynolds Gallery

Museums in Vancouver
Art museums and galleries in British Columbia